Falsimargarita coriolis is a species of sea snail, a marine gastropod mollusk, in the family Calliostomatidae within the superfamily Trochoidea, the top snails, turban snails and their allies.

Description
The length of the shell attains 5.8 mm.

Distribution
This species occurs in New Caledonian Exclusive Economic Zone.

References

Calliostomatidae